Bob Renney (born 18 March 1975) is an Australian former wrestler who competed in the 1996 Summer Olympics.

References

External links
 

1975 births
Living people
Olympic wrestlers of Australia
Wrestlers at the 1996 Summer Olympics
Australian male sport wrestlers